Pertusa is a municipality located in the province of Huesca, Aragon, Spain.
 
According to the 2004 census (INE), the municipality has a population of 135 inhabitants.

History 
Pertusa was an Ilergetes settlement, known only under the same name, which was given under Roman rule.

References

 Dictionary of Greek and Roman Geography, by William Smith

Pertusa